Carl Fieger (1893–1960) was a German architect, designer, and teacher at the Bauhaus.

Life

Early life 
Carl Fieger was born in Mainz, German Empire on June 15, 1893. Beginning in 1908, Fieger studied at the Mainz Art and Vocational School. After completing his studies in 1911, he worked at the studio of Peter Behrens where he became acquainted with Le Corbusier and Walter Gropius. In 1912, Fieger began working for Walter Gropius, with whom he would collaborate until 1934. Among the designs Fieger was involved with at Gropius' studio were the Fagus Factory (1922) and Bauhaus Building (1925).

In 1921, Gropius appointed Fieger as a teacher of architectural drawing at the Bauhaus, Weimar.

In 1934, Fieger was blacklisted by the Nazi Party, though he continued to produce architectural work anonymously.

Postwar 
Following World War II Fieger participated in the rebuilding of Dessau and was involved in Hubert Hoffmann's efforts to reopen the Bauhaus.

In 1952, he began working as a research fellow at Deutsche Bauakademie in East Berlin.

Carl Fieger died on November 21, 1960 in Dessau, East Germany at age 67.

Gallery

References 

Academic staff of the Bauhaus
20th-century German architects
1893 births
1960 deaths
Modernist architects from Germany
People from Mainz